James Cooke may refer to:

 James J. Cooke (1939–2016), American historian, author, academic and soldier
 James W. Cooke (1812–1869), American naval officer
 James Cooke (pentathlete) (born 1991), British modern pentathlete
 James Cooke (sailor) (born 1935), Singaporean Olympic sailor
 James Francis Cooke (1875–1960), American pianist, composer and writer
 James Douglas Cooke (1879–1949), British Member of Parliament for Hammersmith South
 James "Curley" Cooke (1967–2011), former guitarist for the Steve Miller Band
 Jimmy Cooke (fl. 1932), American baseball player

See also
 James Cooke Brown (1921–2000), sociologist and science fiction writer
 James Cook (disambiguation)